Mire de Tibães is a Portuguese parish, located in the municipality of Braga. The population in 2011 was 2,437, in an area of 4.36 km². In Tibães is located the famous Monastery of Tibães, founded in the 6th century and now owned by the government.

References

Freguesias of Braga